Spanby is a village and former civil parish in the North Kesteven district of Lincolnshire, England, about  south from the town of Sleaford. Since 1931 the village has been part of the civil parish of Threekingham. It is in the civil parish of Osbournby.

The 1086 Domesday Book lists the village as "Spanebi", consisting of 12 households.

The parish church is a Grade II listed building dedicated to Saint Nicholas. It was declared redundant by the Diocese of Lincoln in 1973, and is now used as a shed. The 1882 rebuilt red-brick building is on or near the site of an earlier church dating from the 13th century. The door to the vestry dates from the 14th century.

References

External links

Villages in Lincolnshire
North Kesteven District
Former civil parishes in Lincolnshire